Archery at the 2017 Games of the Small States of Europe was held in Montecchio Stadium in San Marino from 30 May to 2 June 2017.

Medal table

Medal summary

Recurve

Compound

References

External links
Official results
Results book

2017 Games of the Small States of Europe
Games of the Small States of Europe
2017
Archery in San Marino